Boys II Men is the first studio album by Maskinen, released on 18 November 2009.

Track listing
"Segertåget" - 3:26
"Bränner" - 3:27
"Dansa med vapen" - 3:35
"Nr 1" - 3:58
"Gatan upp" - 6:37
"Maskinen för alltid" - 1:44
"Undan för pundarn" - 3:32
"Alla som inte dansar" - 3:38
"Flow Ball" (feat. Bonde do Rolê) - 3:47
"Aldrig vart i Malmö" - 4:05
"Buffalo Blues" - 4:29
"Pengar" - 3:12
"Kärlek vid sista ögonkastet" - 4:59

Charts

References

2009 debut albums
Maskinen albums